The Independent Schools Association of the Southwest (ISAS) is a nonprofit association of 89 independent schools located in the U.S. states of Arizona, Kansas, Louisiana, New Mexico, Oklahoma, and Texas. ISAS is a member of the National Association of Independent Schools (NAIS) Commission on Accreditation.

History 

In 1952, “The Association of Texas Preparatory Schools,” a football and basketball league among five private Texas schools (The Kinkaid School, Lutheran, St. John’s School, St. Mark's School of Texas, and St. Stephen's Episcopal School), was founded. This association was to serve as a predecessor for ISAS: in 1955, largely under the influence of St. John's headmaster Alan Chidsey, four of the same institutions (Kinkaid, St. John's, St. Stephen's, and St. Mark's) joined together with three additional Texas schools (The Hockaday School, Saint Mary’s Hall, and the Texas Military Institute) and one Oklahoma school (Casady School) to found the Independent Schools Association of the Southwest. The original "statement of purpose" of the association was to "encourage, support, and develop highest standards of attainment in the independent schools of the area and to recognize those schools in which they are maintained.” In 1966, the stated purpose was amended to include the phrase "to recognize by formal accreditation,” and an additional accreditation requirement was imposed: at least 75% of the graduates of each member school must complete their first year of college.

By ISAS's quinquagenary anniversary in 2005, the association had grown to include 84 schools spanning six states; in the same year, the Southwest Preparatory Conference (SPC) split from ISAS to form an independent athletic conference. By 2012, ISAS had expanded to include all of its current 89 member schools.

Arts festival 

Since 1967, the Independent Schools Association of the Southwest has held its annual ISAS Arts Festival, hosted at a different member schools' campus each year. The popular event typically lasts three days, during which time students from the various art programs of upwards of thirty ISAS member schools congregate in a noncompetitive atmosphere to perform and create art in "a celebration of sharing and learning with critiques by professional artists and performers." Recent years' ISAS Arts Festivals, such as the 2016 Festival hosted at Saint Mary's Hall in San Antonio, Texas, have seen attendances of more than 3,000 student artists.

Member institutions 

Arizona

 All Saints' Episcopal Day School
 The Gregory School

Kansas

 Wichita Collegiate School

Louisiana
 Academy of the Sacred Heart (New Orleans)
 Schools of the Sacred Heart at Grand Coteau
 Alexandria Country Day School
 Christ Episcopal School
 Episcopal School of Acadiana
 Isidore Newman School
 Louise S. McGehee School
 Metairie Park Country Day School
 Southfield School (Shreveport, Louisiana)|Southfield School
 St. Andrew's Episcopal School, New Orleans
[St. George's Episcopal School
 St. Martin's Episcopal School
 St. Paul's Episcopal School, New Orleans
 Stuart Hall School for Boys
[Trinity Episcopal School New Orleans|Trinity Episcopal School

New Mexico

 Albuquerque Academy
 Bosque School
 Manzano Day School
 Menaul School
 Rio Grande School
 Sandia Preparatory School
 Santa Fe Preparatory School
 UWC-USA

Oklahoma

 Casady School
 Heritage Hall School
 Holland Hall
 Riverfield Country Day School
 Westminster School

Texas

 Alcuin School
 All Saints' Episcopal School, Fort Worth
 All Saints Episcopal School, Tyler
 Allen Academy
 Annunciation Orthodox School
 Austin International School
 Austin Waldorf School
 The Awty International School
 Beth Yeshurun Day School
 The Branch School
 Cistercian Preparatory School
 Dallas International School
 Duchesne Academy of the Sacred Heart
 The Emery/Weiner School
 Episcopal High School, Houston
 The Episcopal School of Dallas
 First Baptist Academy
 Fort Worth Country Day
 The Girls' School of Austin
 Good Shepherd Episcopal School
 Greenhill School
 The Hockaday School
 The John Cooper School
 The Joy School
 Keystone School
 The Kinkaid School
 Lakehill Preparatory School
 The Lamplighter School
 The Montessori School of San Antonio
 The Oakridge School
 Parish Episcopal School
 The Post Oak School
 Presbyterian School
 The Regis School of the Sacred Heart
 River Oaks Baptist School
 Saint Mary's Hall
 San Antonio Academy
 Shelton School
 The Shlenker School
 St. Andrew's Episcopal School, Austin
 St. Clement's Parish School
 St. Francis Episcopal Day School
 St. Gabriel's Catholic School
 St. John's Episcopal School, Dallas
 St. John's School, Houston
 St. Luke's Episcopal School
 St. Mark's Episcopal School
 St. Mark's School of Texas
 St. Philip's School and Community Center
 St. Stephen's Episcopal School
 The Winston School, Dallas
 TMI - The Episcopal School of Texas
 Trinity Episcopal School, Austin
 Trinity Episcopal School, Galveston
 Trinity School of Midland
 Trinity Valley School
 Ursuline Academy of Dallas
 The Winston School San Antonio

References

 
Private schools in the United States